G31 may refer to:
 BMW 5 Series 5-door estate/wagon (G31)
 Brazilian landing ship Rio de Janeiro (G31)
 Junkers G 31
 Mali G31, a graphics processing unit in the Mali (GPU) series